Rhonda Suzanne Burchmore OAM (born 15 May 1960) is an Australian entertainer.

Career
Burchmore appeared as Kate in the 1982 film, The Pirate Movie. Burchmore gave her first Australian theatre performance in the 1988 production of Sugar Babies opposite Garry McDonald and Broadway performer Eddie Bracken. Later that year, she had a role in the West End production of Sugar Babies opposite Mickey Rooney and Ann Miller. Whilst in the U.K, Burchmore was cast in the revival of Stop the World – I Want to Get Off as well as a role in Hot Shoe Shuffle.

In 1997, Burchmore opened Melbourne's Crown Casino starring in Red Hot & Rhonda.

Burchmore had a role of Nadine Hale in Tommy Tune's stage version of Irving Berlin's Easter Parade, slated for Broadway but eventually the project stalled. Burchmore later appeared in another show, Stephen Sondheim's Into the Woods with the Melbourne Theatre Company (MTC).

Burchmore released her first album in 1998, the self-titled Rhonda Burchmore. Further albums include Midnight Rendezvous, Live at the Melbourne Concert Hall, Pure Imagination, and a recording of her stage show, Cry Me a River – The World of Julie London.

In 1999, Burchmore played the lead role in The Production Company's first show, Mame. She also played the roles in  The Boyfriend Jerry's Girls & La Cage Aux Folles for The Production Company, and later returned in a new production of Mame in 2008.

Further roles followed, including Adelaide in an Australian revival of Guys and Dolls, Tanya in the successful Mamma Mia!, Urinetown The Musical, Tom Foolery, Respect: A Musical Journey of Women, and her own productions; Rhonda Burchmore Sings 'n Swings, My Funny Valentines and Fever.

In 2013, she performed in Trevor Ashley's musical comedy Little Orphan trAshley with Gary Sweet.

Other Australian stage credits include The Drowsy Chaperone in 2010 with Geoffrey Rush for the MTC, Song and Dance, They're Playing Our Song – as one of the alter egos, and Diana in Lend Me a Tenor. With the Victorian Opera Burchmore performed as Queen of the Fairies in Iolanthe, as Prince Orlofsky in Die Fledermaus with Joan Carden, in Ruddigore and An Evening with Sondheim.

Burchmore's television credits include regular appearances on Carols by Candlelight, in the variety show Hey Hey It's Saturday, the quiz show Spicks and Specks and also guest roles in the sitcom Kath & Kim and on the TV series Love Child.

In 2019, it was announced Burchmore had been cast in the role of Grandma Viv in new Seven Network sitcom, Fam Time.

In 2020, Burchmore entered the Jungle to compete in the sixth season of the Australian version of I'm a Celebrity...Get Me Out of Here! and was placed third.

Personal life
Burchmore was born in Sydney, and attended Beverly Hills Girls High School. She gained a scholarship to the University of New England where she majored in Theatre Arts. Burchmore and her husband, Nick, a psychiatrist, have one daughter, Lexie. In 2010 she published her autobiography, Legs 11: The Rhonda Burchmore Story, named after the bingo-based popular epithet for her long-legged physique.

Discography

Albums

Charting singles

Honours
In the January 2014 Australia Day Honours List Burchmore was awarded a medal of the Order of Australia (OAM) "For service to the performing arts, and to the community."

Mo Awards
The Australian Entertainment Mo Awards (commonly known informally as the Mo Awards), were annual Australian entertainment industry awards. They recognise achievements in live entertainment in Australia from 1975 to 2016. Rhonda Burchmore won one award in that time.
 (wins only)
|-
| 1999
| Rhonda Burchmore
| Female Vocal Variety Performer of the Year 
| 
|-

References

External links

1960 births
Living people
University of New England (Australia) alumni
Australian musical theatre actresses
20th-century Australian women singers
Australian contraltos
Recipients of the Medal of the Order of Australia
Australian female dancers
I'm a Celebrity...Get Me Out of Here! (Australian TV series) participants
Actresses from Sydney
Australian stage actresses